Marcia Rachel Clark ( Kleks, formerly Horowitz; born August 31, 1953) is an American prosecutor, author, television correspondent and television producer. She is known for being the lead prosecutor in the O. J. Simpson murder case.

Early life and education
Clark was born Marcia Rachel Kleks in Alameda, California, the daughter of Rozlyn (née Masur) and Abraham Kleks. Her father was born and raised in Israel, and worked as a chemist for the FDA. She was raised in a Jewish family. She has a younger brother by six years who became an engineer. Due to her father's job with the FDA, the family moved many times, living in California, New York, Michigan, and Maryland.

Kleks graduated from Susan E. Wagner High School, a public school in the Manor Heights section of Staten Island, New York City. She studied at the University of California, Los Angeles, graduating in 1976 with a degree in political science, then earned a Juris Doctor degree at Southwestern University School of Law.

Career

Attorney
Clark was admitted to the State Bar of California in 1979. She was in private practice and worked as a public defender for the city of Los Angeles before she became a prosecutor in 1981. She worked as a deputy district attorney for Los Angeles County, California, and was mentored by prosecutor Harvey Giss.

Clark is best remembered as the lead prosecutor in the 1995 trial of O. J. Simpson on charges of the murders of his ex-wife Nicole Brown Simpson and Ron Goldman. Prior to this trial, Clark's highest-profile prosecution was in 1991, when she prosecuted Robert John Bardo for the murder of television star Rebecca Schaeffer.
Clark said that the media attention she received during the trial was "the hell of the trial", calling herself "famous in a way that was kind of terrifying". Clark was advised by a jury consultant to "talk softer, dress softer, wear pastels" as a means to improve her image. She subsequently changed her hairstyle into a perm, and the Los Angeles Times described her as looking like "Sigourney Weaver, only more professional". The New York Times commented that "the transformation was not entirely seamless".

Commentator and author
Clark resigned from the District Attorney's office after she lost the O. J. Simpson case and left trial practice behind her. She and Teresa Carpenter wrote  a book about the Simpson case, Without a Doubt, in a deal reported to be worth $4.2 million.

Since the Simpson trial, Clark has made numerous appearances on television, including being a "special correspondent" for Entertainment Tonight. She provided coverage of high-profile trials and reported from the red carpet at awards shows such as the Emmy Awards. She was a guest attorney on the short-lived television series Power of Attorney, and was also featured on Headline News (HLN), where she analyzed the Casey Anthony trial. In July 2013, Clark provided commentary for CNN on the trial of George Zimmerman in Florida for the homicide of Trayvon Martin.

Clark wrote a pilot script for a TV series called Borderland, centering on "a very dark version of the DA's office", which was purchased by FX but never produced. She has contributed true crime articles to The Daily Beast.

Clark has written several novels. Her "Rachel Knight" series centers on a prosecutor in the Los Angeles District Attorney's office, and includes Guilt By Association (2011), Guilt By Degrees (2012), Killer Ambition (2013), and The Competition (2014). Guilt by Association was adapted as a television pilot for TNT in 2014.

In contrast, Clark's "Samantha Brinkman" series features a woman who is a defense attorney. It includes Blood Defense (2016), Moral Defense (2016), and Snap Judgment (2017), and is being adapted into a TV series for NBC, co-written by Clark. Clark never expected to be an author, but said, "As a lawyer, I came to understand early that storytelling plays a very important part when you address a jury. So I guess my instincts have always kind of been there when it comes to weaving a narrative." She read Nancy Drew and The Hardy Boys mystery fiction as a child, and said "I have been addicted to crime since I was born. I was making up crime stories when I was a 4- or 5-year-old kid."

In popular culture
In August 2013, Clark appeared as Attorney Sidney Barnes in the Pretty Little Liars episode, "Now You See Me, Now You Don't".

In 2015, Clark was parodied on the sitcom Unbreakable Kimmy Schmidt in the form of the character "Marcia", implied to be Marcia Clark, now in a relationship with "Chris" Darden, portrayed by Tina Fey. Fey was nominated for a Primetime Emmy Award for Outstanding Guest Actress in a Comedy Series for the role.

Clark appears in the 2016 documentary miniseries O.J.: Made in America. She is played by Sarah Paulson in the 2016 television series The People v. O. J. Simpson: American Crime Story, which focuses on the O. J. Simpson trial. Paulson's performance as Clark earned wide acclaim, and she earned a Primetime Emmy Award and a Golden Globe Award for the role. Clark attended the Emmy Awards with Paulson on September 18, 2016. Katey Rich wrote in Vanity Fair that the series positions Clark as a "feminist hero".

In 2019, Clark appeared in the 18th season finale of Gordon Ramsay's reality series Hell's Kitchen as a VIP guest diner for winner and season six veteran Ariel Contreras-Fox.

Personal life
When Clark was 17 years old, she was raped on a trip to Eilat, Israel. She has said it was an experience she did not deal with until much later, and that it influenced much of why she became a prosecutor.

In 1976, Clark married Gabriel Horowitz, an Israeli professional backgammon player whom she met while they were students at UCLA. 
 They obtained a "Tijuana divorce" in 1980, and had no children. Horowitz was briefly in the news after he sold topless photos of Clark to the National Enquirer during the O. J. Simpson trial.

In 1980, Clark married her second husband, Gordon Clark, a computer programmer and systems administrator who was employed at the Church of Scientology. They were divorced in 1995 and had two sons, born circa 1990 and 1992. Gordon argued at a custody hearing during the Simpson trial that he should receive full custody of their children due to the long hours Marcia spent working for the trial.

Clark no longer considers herself a religious person, although she was raised Jewish and her first wedding was a Conservative Jewish ceremony. She was a member of the Church of Scientology but since 1980 is no longer associated with it.

She lives in Calabasas, California.

Bibliography

Non-fiction
 Without a Doubt with Teresa Carpenter (1997). Viking Press.

Rachel Knight series
 Guilt By Association (2011). Mulholland Books. 
 Guilt By Degrees (2012). Mulholland Books. 
 Killer Ambition (2013). Mulholland Books. 
 The Competition (2014). Mulholland Books. 
 If I'm Dead: A Rachel Knight Story (2012). Mulholland Books. Digital.
 Trouble in Paradise: A Rachel Knight Story (2013). Mulholland Books. Digital.

Samantha Brinkman series
 Blood Defense (2016). Thomas & Mercer. 
 Moral Defense (2016). Thomas & Mercer. 
 Snap Judgment (2017). Thomas & Mercer. 
 Final Judgment (2020). Thomas & Mercer.

References

External links

 Interview in SHOTS Crime and Thriller Ezine June 2011
 California State Bar Entry for Marcia Clark

1953 births
Living people
American people of Israeli descent
American prosecutors
Jewish American attorneys
California lawyers
O. J. Simpson murder case
People from Alameda, California
People from Staten Island
Southwestern Law School alumni
University of California, Los Angeles alumni
Writers from Los Angeles
20th-century American women lawyers
20th-century American lawyers
21st-century American women